Leuronotus is a genus of longhorn beetles of the subfamily Lamiinae, containing the following species:

 Leuronotus affinis Breuning, 1970
 Leuronotus spatulatus Gahan, 1888

References

Lamiini